Vasco Tagliavini (17 October 1937 – 3 July 2019) was an Italian professional football player and coach who also coached the Italy national futsal team. He played for many years in the Italian leagues.

References

1937 births
2019 deaths
Italian footballers
Serie A players
Inter Milan players
Udinese Calcio players
Calcio Foggia 1920 players
Novara F.C. players
Italian football managers
U.S. Triestina Calcio 1918 managers
Calcio Foggia 1920 managers
Treviso F.B.C. 1993 managers
Association football defenders
Sportspeople from Reggio Emilia
Footballers from Emilia-Romagna